Kate Wilson may refer to:
Kate Wilson (scientist), Australian scientist
Kate Wilson (swimmer) (born 1998), Australian Paralympic swimmer
Kate Wilson (The Passage), fictional character
Kate Wilson in Hydrophobia (video game)
Kate Wilson-Smith, badminton player

See also
Katherine Wilson (disambiguation)